The women's marathon competition of the athletics events at the 2015 Pan American Games took place on the 18 of July on a temporary circuit around the Ontario Place West Channel. The defending Pan American Games champion is Adriana Aparecida da Silva of Brazil.

Records

Qualification

Each National Olympic Committee (NOC) was able to enter up to two entrants providing they had met the minimum standard (2.55.00) in the qualifying period (January 1, 2014 to June 28, 2015).

Schedule

Abbreviations
All times shown are in hours:minutes:seconds

Results

Final

References

Athletics at the 2015 Pan American Games
2015
2015 in women's athletics
Panamerican
2015
2015 Panamerican Games